The Apostolic Vicariate of the Lancashire District was an ecclesiastical jurisdiction of the Catholic Church in England. It was led by a vicar apostolic who was a titular bishop. The apostolic vicariate was created in 1840 and was replaced by two dioceses in 1850.

History
The Apostolic Vicariate of the Lancashire District was created out of the Northern District on 11 May 1840. The Lancashire District comprised the historic counties of Lancashire and Cheshire, plus the Isle of Man. The vicar apostolic of the district was Bishop George Hilary Brown, who was appointed on 5 June 1840. Three years later, Bishop James Sharples was appointed coadjutor vicar apostolic on 7 August 1843 to assist Bishop Brown in overseeing the district.

On the restoration of the hierarchy in England and Wales by Pope Pius IX on 29 September 1850, thirteen dioceses were established. Most of the Lancashire District was replaced by the dioceses of Liverpool and Salford. The Diocese of Liverpool comprised the hundreds of West Derby, Leyland, Lonsdale and Amounderness in Lancashire, plus the Isle of Man. The Liverpool diocese was later elevated to the status of archdiocese on 28 October 1911. The Diocese of Salford comprised the hundreds of Salford and Blackburn in Lancashire. The remainder of the district, the county of Cheshire, became part of the Diocese of Shrewsbury.

Vicars Apostolic

References

Bibliography

 

Apostolic vicariates
Lancashire District
History of Catholicism in the United Kingdom
History of Greater Manchester
History of Lancashire
History of Merseyside